The Chile women's national under-21 field hockey team represents Chile in international under-21 field hockey competitions. The team is controlled by the governing body for field hockey in Chile, the Federación Chilena de Hockey sobre Césped, which is a member of the Pan American Hockey Federation (PAHF) and the International Hockey Federation (FIH).

The team's first recorded appearance was at the 1988 Pan American Junior Championship, where the team finished in third place.

The team's last appearance was in 2021, during the Pan American Junior Championship in Santiago.

History

Tournament Records

Team

Current squad
The following 18 players represented Chile at the 2021 Pan American Junior Championship in Santiago.

Caps and goals updated as of 28 August 2021 after the match against the United States.

Past squads
{|width="100%"
|width="50%" valign="top" align="center"|
Pan American Junior Championship

Constanza Abud (GK)
Pilar Donoso
Cristine Fingerhuth
Alexandra Sclabos
Catalina Thiermann
Camila Infante
Denise Infante
Carolina García (C)
Fernanda Carvajal
María Fernández
Beatriz Albertz
Francisca Flores
Camila Cabargas
Cristina Wagner
Daniela Caram
Sofía Walbaum
Francisca Pizarro
Alejandra Delgado (GK)

Claudia Schüler (GK)
Sofía Walbaum (C)
Javiera MacKenna
Beatriz Thiermann
Camila Caram
María José MacKenna
Manuela Urroz
Cristina Wagner
Cristine Fingerhuth
Marianne Pollmann
Andrea Greene
Josefa Villalabeitia
Catalina Sclabos
Paula Leinz
Camila Vargas
Carla Manettí
Valentina Crúz
Macarena Liu (GK)

Beatriz Wirth (GK)
María José MacKenna
Denise Krimerman
Catalina Barahona
Constanza Palma
Fernanda Flores (C)
Sofía Filipek
Josefina Khamis
Francisca Vidaurre
Manuela Urroz
Agustina Venegas
Constanza Olivares (GK)
Josefina Poblete
Trinidad Sotomeyer
Josefa Salas
Catalina Salas
Francisca Tala
Tatiana Sclabos

Juliana López (GK)
Josefina Cambiaso
Fernanda Manríquez
Fernanda Villagrán
María Maldonado
Agustina Solano
Josefa Salas
Sophia Lahsen
Catalina Peragallo
Sofía Machado
Paula Valdivia
Noemi Abusleme (GK)
Pilar Zapico
Antonia Morales
Doménica Ananías
Consuelo de las Heras
Denise Krimerman (C)
Kim Jacob

Rosario Lanz (GK)
Paula Sanz
Amanda Martínez
Francisca Parra (C)
Valeria Nazal
Dominga Lüders
Michaela Stockins
Fernanda Arrieta
Simone Avelli
Michelle de Witt
Antonia Irazoqui
Constanza Jugo
Carolina Mújica
Francisca Irazoqui
Fernanda Ramírez
Constanza Pérez
Milagros Gago
Antonia Sáez (GK)

|width="50%" valign="top" align="center"|
FIH Junior World Cup

Constanza Abud (GK)
Sofía Walbaum
Andrea Sánchez
Alexandra Sclabos
Catalina Thiermann
Francisca Pizarro
Denise Infante
Carolina García (C)
Camila Infante
María Fernández
Beatriz Albertz
Claudia Schüler (GK)
Veronica Bosch
Cristina Wagner
Daniela Caram
Fernanda Carvajal
Pilar Donoso
Francisca Flores

Beatriz Wirth (GK)
Sofía Walbaum (C)
Javiera MacKenna
Constanza Sánchez
Camila Caram
María José MacKenna
Manuela Urroz
Paula Leniz
Josefa Villalabeitia
Marianne Pollmann
Andrea Greene
Valentina Cerda (GK)
Catalina Sclabos
Constanza Palma
Paula Liu
María Jesús Arestizabal
Tatiana Sclabos 
Francisca Vidaurre

Sachi Ananías (GK)
Josefina Cambiaso
Fernanda Villagrán
María Maldonado
Agustina Solano
Josefa Salas
Sophia Lahsen
Catalina Peragallo
Sofía Machado
Paula Valdivia
Noemi Abusleme (GK)
Pilar Zapico
Antonia Morales
Doménica Ananías
Consuelo de las Heras
Denise Krimerman (C)
Florencia Martínez
Kim Jacob

|}

References

External links
Federación Chilena de Hockey sobre Césped
FIH profile

Women's national under-21 field hockey teams
Field hockey
National team